Beach House on the Moon is the twenty-third studio album by American singer-songwriter Jimmy Buffett and was released on May 24, 1999. It is his second and last studio album released on Island Records and the last release of Margaritaville Records. It reached #8 on the Billboard 200 chart.

Songs
The song "Math Suks" caused a brief media frenzy over Jimmy Buffett's seeming disdain for math education.

Track listing

Musicians

The Coral Reefer Band
 Keyboards: Michael Utley
 Harmonica: Greg "Fingers" Taylor
 Steel Drums: Robert Greenidge
 Percussion: Ralph MacDonald
 Drums: Roger Guth
 Guitar: Jimmy Buffett, Peter Mayer, Mac McAnally
 Bass guitar: Jim Mayer
 Saxophone: Amy Lee, Tom Mitchell
 Trumpet: John Lovell
 Vocals: Peter Mayer, Jim Mayer, Mac McAnally, Nadirah Shakoor, Tina Gullickson

Additional musicians
 Steel Guitar: Doyle Grisham ("If you hear steel guitar it's Doyle.")
 Slide Guitar: Jack Pearson (Tracks 3, 7, 5, and 10)
 Bass guitar: David Hood (Tracks 3, 6, 7, and 10)
 Drums: Roger Hawkins (Tracks 3, 6, 7, and 10)
 Flute: Bill Miller (Track 1)
 Fiddle: Stuart Duncan (Tracks 7 and 10)
 Tenor Saxophone: Jim Horn (Track 6)
 Accordion: Marc Savoy (Track 7)
 Vocals: The Tams (Track 6)

Charts

Weekly charts

Year-end charts

Certifications

References

Jimmy Buffett albums
1999 albums
Island Records albums